Skopkortnaya is a rural locality (a settlement) and the administrative center of Skopkortnenskoye Rural Settlement, Alexandrovsky District, Perm Krai, Russia. The population was 335 as of 2010. There are 13 streets.

Geography 
Skopkortnaya is located 48 km northeast of Alexandrovsk (the district's administrative centre) by road. Chanvinsky karyer is the nearest rural locality.

References 

Rural localities in Alexandrovsky District